Give Me Your Love may refer to:

Albums
Give Me Your Love (Barbara Mason album), 1973
Give Me Your Love (Sylvia Striplin album) or the title song, 1981
Give Me Your Love, by Fame, 2003
Give Me Your Love, by G. C. Cameron, 1983
Give Me Your Love, by Jimmy Ye Liang Jun, 1993
Give Me Your Love, by Sisters Love, 2006

Songs
"Give Me Your Love" (Fame song), 2003 Sweden Eurovision Song Contest entry
"Give Me Your Love" (Sigala song), 2016
"Give Me Your Love", by Alton Ellis and David Gordon (of The Flames), 1968
"Give Me Your Love", by Andy Kim, 1964
"Give Me Your Love", by Anne Murray from Harmony, 1987
"Give Me Your Love", by The Babys from Broken Heart, 1977
"Give Me Your Love", by Don Cornell, 1955
"Give Me Your Love", by Fun Fun, 1984
"Give Me Your Love", by Jerry Butler, 1963
"Give Me Your Love", by Lee Dorsey, 1962
"Give Me Your Love", by Nat King Cole, 1959
"Give Me Your Love", by The Real Thing, 1980
"Give Me Your Love", by Sticks Herman
"Give Me Your Love", by T-Connection, 1981
"Give Me Your Love", by Winder, 1984
"Give Me Your Love", by XTM, 2005
"Give Me Your Love (Love Song)", by Curtis Mayfield from the Super Fly film soundtrack